Lecithocera monobyrsa is a moth in the family Lecithoceridae. It was described by Edward Meyrick in 1931. It is found in Uganda.

The wingspan is about 18 mm. The forewings are light brownish ochreous and the hindwings are greyish ochreous.

References

Moths described in 1931
Taxa named by Edward Meyrick
monobyrsa